Sequencer may refer to:

Technology
 Drum sequencer (controller), an electromechanical system for controlling a sequence of events automatically
 DNA sequencer, a machine used to automatically produce a sequence readout from a biological DNA sample
 Microsequencer, part of the control unit of a CPU
 Music sequencer, software or hardware device for recording, playing, and editing digital music data
 Protein sequencer, a machine used to automatically produce a sequence readout from a biological protein sample

Arts and entertainment
 Sequencer (Larry Fast album), 1976
 Sequencer (Covenant album), 1996
 "Sequencer", a song by Al Di Meola from his album Scenario

See also
 Sequence (disambiguation)